Violet Perfume: No One Is Listening is a 2001 Mexican drama film directed by Maryse Sistach. It was Mexico's submission to the 74th Academy Awards for the Academy Award for Best Foreign Language Film, but was not accepted as a nominee.

Cast 
 Ximena Ayala - Yessica
 Nancy Gutiérrez - Miriam
 Arcelia Ramírez - Alicia, madre de Miriam
 María Rojo - Madre de Yessica
 Luis Fernando Peña - Jorge
 Gabino Rodríguez - Héctor
 Pablo Delgado - Juan

Awards
Violet Perfume: No One Is Listening won five Ariel awards:

 Best Actress: Ximena Ayala
 Best Supporting Actress: Arcelia Ramírez
 Best original script: José Buil
 Best Art Direction
 Best Costume Design

See also
List of submissions to the 74th Academy Awards for Best Foreign Language Film

References

External links

2001 films
2001 drama films
2000s Spanish-language films
Mexican drama films
2000s Mexican films